For You and Me is the seventeenth album by Popol Vuh. It was originally released in 1991 on Milan Records. In 2006 SPV re-released the album with one bonus track.

Track listing 
All tracks composed by Florian Fricke except where noted.

 "For You and Me" – 5:24
 "Wind of the Stars in Their Eyes" (Anne-Marie O'Farell) – 3:03
 "Little Bazaari" – 7:48
 "Compassion" – 5:57
 "When Love Is Calling You" (Fricke, Daniel Fichelscher) – 4:11
 "In Your Eyes" (Guido Hieronymus) – 0:55
 "OM Mani Padme Hum 1" (Fricke, Hieronymus) – 1:09
 "OM Mani Padme Hum 2" – 2:45
 "OM Mani Padme Hum 3" – 4:30
 "OM Mani Padme Hum 4" – 5:17
 "For You" – 2:02

2006 bonus track
 "OM Mani Padme Hum 3" (Piano Version) – 4:31 

"When Love Is Calling You" is a new version of "Letzte Tage - Letzte Nächte" from the album Letzte Tage – Letzte Nächte (1976)

Personnel

Popol Vuh
 Florian Fricke: piano
 Daniel Fichelscher: guitar
 Renate Knaup: vocals

Additional Personnel
Guido Hieronymus: keyboards, guitar
Anne-Marie O'Farell: Irish harp (on 2)

Credits 
Recorded at New African Studio, Munich & Sound Fabrik, Munich, January - April 1991 
Arranged by Guido Hieronymus and Popol Vuh 
Produced by Popol Vuh for Milan Records 
Executive producers: Florian Fricke and Frank Fiedler

Executive direction by Emmanuel Chamboredon and Toby Pieniek 
Art direction by Judy Kaganowich 
Package supervision by Dana Renert

References

External links 
 
https://web.archive.org/web/20081029050641/http://www.furious.com/perfect/populvuh.html (Comprehensive article & review of every album, in English)
https://web.archive.org/web/20080119183134/http://www.enricobassi.it/popvuhdiscografia90.htm (featuring the original credits)
http://www.venco.com.pl/~acrux/foryou.htm

Popol Vuh (band) albums
1991 albums